The Catholic Church in Lithuania is part of the worldwide Catholic Church, under the spiritual leadership of the Pope in Rome. Lithuania is the world's northernmost Catholic majority country. Pope Pius XII gave Lithuania the title of "northernmost outpost of Catholicism in Europe" in 1939.

Among the Baltic states, Lithuania is the country with the highest percentage of Catholic population. Almost three-quarters (74.19%) of Lithuania's population, self-identified as Catholics in the 2021 census. The country is divided into eight dioceses including two archdioceses and a military ordinariate.

St. Casimir (Kazimieras, 1458–1484) is the only canonized saint of Lithuania. He is the patron of the country and Lithuanian youth. Archbishop Jurgis Matulaitis-Matulevičius (1871–1927) was beatified in 1987.

History

Middle Ages (–1500)

11th century 
The missionary bishop Saint Bruno of Querfurt was martyred in 1009 for preaching the Christian faith. Some historians write that he was martyred by the Lithuanians, but Zigmas Zinkevičius contests this and says that Bruno was killed in lands inhabited by the Yotvingians. The name of Lithuania was mentioned for the first time due to this.

13th century 
Catholicism began to spread in Lithuania in the 13th century. The Dominican Order and the Franciscans began to be established in Lithuania during the rule of Mindaugas. The Dominican Saint Hyacinth came to Lithuania in 1231. In 1251, a Lithuanian delegation sent by Lithuania's ruler Mindaugas informed Pope Innocent IV that Mindaugas would like to be baptised as Roman Catholic. The Pope enthusiastically accepted the Lithuanian conversion, writing even six papal bulls regarding this matter. In the first half of 1251, Mindaugas and many of his subjects, including part of the Lithuanian nobility, were baptised as Roman Catholics.

The ruler's baptism meant that Lithuania became an officially Catholic country that was internationally recognized already in the 1250s. The Pope obliged the Bishop of Culm  to crown Mindaugas with the king's crown in the Pope's name. On 6 July 1253, Mindaugas was crowned king of Lithuania, while Morta became Queen of Lithuania. On August 21, the Pope appointed the Teutonic Order priest Christian as the bishop of Lithuania, thus establishing the Diocese of Lithuania. According to the Lithuanian bishop Jonas Boruta, "A separate diocese directly subordinate to the Pope is already a considerable step for the creation of an ecclesiastical province, and in the Lithuania of Mindaugas' time (if not for unfortunate political events - the murder of Mindaugas, etc.) there were all the conditions for the establishment of an ecclesiastical province as well.."

After Mindaugas' assassination, Treniota, who ruled Lithuania for about a year after rising to power in 1263, began persecuting Christians. In 1264, after Treniota was killed, the Lithuania was ruled by Mindaugas' son Vaišvilkas, followed by Mindaugas' son-in-law Shvarn, who were both Orthodox. The latter died during the struggle for power within Lithuania and the following Grand Dukes of Lithuania were pagans.

14th century 
During the 14th century, Lithuania's pagan rulers, for example, Vytenis and Gediminas, built Catholic churches and invited Catholic priests and monks to Lithuania. The pagan Lithuanian Grand Dukes Vytenis built a Catholic church in Naugardukas and asked for 2 Franciscans to administer it, but the Teutonic Order's knights destroyed the church.

Gediminas' rule (1316–1341) 
Vytenis' successor, Gediminas, who was also a pagan, formed an alliance with the Archbishop of Riga against the Teutonic Order. Since the beginning of their first alliance in 1298, Riga's Franciscans and Dominicans could freely operate in Lithuania. Later, the Archbishop of Riga  wanted to establish Franciscan and Dominican monasteries in Lithuanian cities, in which he succeeded. In Gediminas' estates, Franciscans and Dominicans were active. In Vilnius, two churches were built, with one being for the Dominicans and the other for the Franciscans. There was also a Franciscan church in Naugardukas. Encouraged by these monks and in the pursuit of political goals, Gediminas wrote a letter to the Pope in 1322 promising to become Roman Catholic. In 1323, Gediminas wrote letters to the superiors of monasteries in Western Europe and invited priests, monks and lay Christians to come to Lithuania, while promising them freedom of religion.

The Pope promised to send his legates to Gediminas in June 1324 and they arrived in Riga by autumn. They sent their representatives to Gediminas, but he refused to be baptized and pretended not to know anything about his promise to be baptized. He blamed this on the Franciscan who wrote the letter to the Pope. Nevertheless, the monks continued to spread Catholicism in Lithuania.

Co-rule by Algirdas and Kęstutis (1345–1377) 
Gediminas's sons Algirdas and Kęstutis, co-rulers of Lithuania from 1345 to 1377, remained pagans their entire lives. Algirdas, who married Duchess Maria of Vitebsk in 1318, inherited the Principality of Vitebsk in 1320, allowed his children to be baptized Orthodox, and founded the Orthodox Metropolis of Lithuania in the Rus' lands under Lithuanian rule. Kęstutis was encouraged by the Pope as well as the kings of Poland and Hungary, for example King Casimir III of Poland, to become baptised.

In 1351, King Louis I of Hungary (who later became king of Poland) wanted Kęstutis to be baptized. He agreed to be baptized on the condition that King Louis I of Hungary would return him the lands seized by the Teutonic Order and ensure Kęstutis' coronation; both parties confirmed the contract by swearing oaths, but Kęstutis remained unbaptised.

Emperor Charles IV, Holy Roman Emperor, sent messengers to Algirdas and Kęstutis in 1358, encouraging them to convert to Catholicism. Lithuania's co-rulers promised to be baptized on the condition that the lands conquered by the Order would be returned to Lithuania, while the Order itself would be brought to the east to fight the Golden Horde Tatars. The conditions were not accepted, so they were not baptised. Although Kęstutis remained a pagan for his life, his daughter Danutė was baptized when she married the Duke of Masovia Janusz I of Warsaw in the 1370s. Pope Gregory XI's efforts to baptize Lithuania in 1373 were also unsuccessful.

Lithuanian Civil Wars (1381–1384; 1389–1392) 

The Grand Dukes of Lithuania Jogaila, Algirdas' son, and Vytautas the Great, Kęstutis' son, sought to ensure Lithuania's baptism. On 31 October 1382, Jogaila negotiated his baptism with the Teutonic Order in the Treaty of Dubysa. In this treaty, Jogaila promised Samogitia until the Dubysa river to the Teutonic Order in return for his help against Kęstutis and Vytautas and promised to be baptized with his subordinates within 4 years. When Jogaila did not ratify the treaty the following year, the Order began supporting Vytautas. Vytautas was baptized Roman Catholic with the baptismal name Wigand on 21 October 1383 in Tepliava. Vytautas promised Samogitia up to Nevėžis to the Teutonic Order and was given to rule 3 castles near the Nemunas river.

With the Act of Krėva in 1385, Jogaila accepted Polish nobility's offer to marry the Queen Hedwig of Poland, the daughter of Louis I of Hungary, and to be crowned King of Poland and accept the Roman Catholic faith. So, Jogaila was baptized on 15 February 1386 as Ladislaus in Kraków together with several brothers and his cousin Vytautas, who was baptised as Alexander. In 1387, Jogaila, accompanied by Bishop Andrzej Jastrzębiec, arrived in Vilnius, where they were aided by Lithuanian-speaking Franciscans. Lithuania, primarily Aukštaitija, was baptised once more in 1387 on the initiative of the grand dukes Jogaila and Vytautas. Jogaila's privilege of 17 February 1387 ensured that the Vilnius Cathedral was provided for, while the diocese of Vilnius was established under Pope Urban VI on 12 March 1388. Jogaila was personally involved in the building of the churches in Maišiagala, Medininkai,  and other places, and established a chapter consisting of a provost, dean and 10 canons. Most of the clergy were Poles. The first Franciscan monasteries were established.

15th century 

A delegation of Samogitian nobility arrived to the Council of Constance in 1417, where they sought to prove that Jogaila and Vytautas are ensuring the baptism of the Samogitians and demanded that Samogitia would remain under Vytautas' rule. In addition, the Samogitian delegation requested that the future diocese in Samogitia be established under the surveillance by the bishops of Vilnius and Lviv. When the Teutonic Order disallowed the delegation formed by the Council of Constance to go and baptize Samogitia, this was done by the bishops of Vilnius and Lviv. The Baptism of Samogitia happened in 1417. The diocese of Samogitia, based in Medininkai, was established in 1421 under Pope Martin V. There was also a chapter consisting of 6 canons and Matthias of Trakai was consecrated as the first bishop of Samogitia. Both the dioceses of Vilnius and Samogitia belonged to the ecclesiastical province of Gniezno until 1795.

With the help of the rulers like Vytautas, Jogaila and others, the number of churches in Lithuania increased rapidly. By the end of the 14th century, there were 17 churches in the Vilnius' diocese, of which 5 were in Vilnius itself. According to the Polish historian , 10 parishes were established by 1392, with a total of 27 parishes throughout the Grand Duchy of Lithuania by the time of the death of Vytautas the Great in 1430. By the end of 15th century, there were 109 churches throughout Lithuania, 91 in Vilnius' diocese and 18 or 19 churches in the Samogitian diocese, of which 7 were founded by Vytautas himself. From then until the mid-16th century, 103 and 38 churches were built in the Vilnius and Samogitian dioceses, respectively. Around 1500, there were 130 churches in Vilnius' diocese.

While the dioceses were being established, churches were mostly built and founded by rulers, later by magnates and nobles. In the foundations by rulers, land was usually assigned to the church, the income from which allowed the maintenance of parish clergy and buildings, while the foundations by nobles concerned funds and church supplies. The noble founders of churches and their heirs usually also inherited the Jus patronatus, which ensured that the parish would be provided with a clergyman.

Early Modern period (1500–1795)

16th century 

In 1530–40, the Reformation and humanist ideas began spreading to the Grand Duchy of Lithuania from Lithuania Minor. In the mid-16th century, Protestantism spread in Lithuania and although the influence of Lutherans initially prevailed, the influence of Calvinists prevailed thereafter. Around 1570, the Reformation reaches its highpoint in the Grand Duchy of Lithuania. During this period, educational activities, the establishment of schools, and book publishing became more active. For example, the first printed book in the Lithuanian language was the Catechism of Martynas Mažvydas, a Lutheran pastor, in 1547.

During the Counter-Reformation, the Catholic Church starts fighting more actively against Arianism and other forms of Protestantism. At the time, Protestant churches and schools were closed down, while most of the Lithuanian nobility, most importantly the Radvila family's Nyasvizh branch, from which came Mikalojus Kristupas Radvila Našlaitėlis and Cardinal Jurgis Radvila, converted to Catholicism.

In 1569, due to the initiative of Bishop Valerijonas Protasevičius, Jesuits were invited to Vilnius. After coming to the geographically distant Baltic, Spaniards, Italians, Germans, as well as some of the first Polish Jesuits, began to learn local languages. The Jesuits learned Lithuanian in the 1570s, and the first foreigners who learned the Lithuanian language were the Spaniards, who learned it to preach and listen to confessions in that language. Sometimes they went to the surrounding villages and sometimes organized sermons in Vilnius' streets. Soon, they quickly introduced the constant and frequent delivery of Lithuanian sermons in Vilnius. Complete lists of those who preached in Lithuanian until up to the 18th century still exist and despite some slight gaps, many of the lists of the Lithuanian Jesuit province have survived. However, in 1570, until they learnt Lithuanian, Jesuits initially delivered sermons in Italian, German and Polish.

The Cardinal Jurgis Radvila founded the Vilnius Theological Seminary in 1582. Bishop Merkelis Giedraitis (1576–1609), who actively encouraged Catholicism in Samogitia, where he built 12 churches and established new parishes, also sent his clerics to it.

In the Third Statute of Lithuania, published in 1588, equal civil and political rights were established for Catholics, Protestants and the Eastern Orthodox within the Grand Duchy of Lithuania. The Union of Lithuanian Brest, the ecclesiastical union of the Orthodox within the Polish–Lithuanian Commonwealth with Rome, happened in 1596.

17th-18th centuries 

The construction of churches supported by noble founders and the establishment of new monasteries intensified very much during the 17th-18th centuries. Schools, hospitals, shelters were built near them. From this time to the destruction of the Lithuanian state in 1795, monasteries became extremely influential because monks participated in all areas of the religious and cultural life of the nation. Most Dominican monasteries in the Grand Duchy of Lithuania were built in the 17th century. The officially Catholic Grand Duchy of Lithuania was partitioned out of existence in the Third Partition of Poland–Lithuania of 1795 by the Protestant Kingdom of Prussia and the Eastern Orthodox Russian Empire. Most of the Lithuanian lands were under Russian rule. After the First Partition of Poland–Lithuania in 1772, Empress Catherine II of Russia created the archdiocese of Mogilev in 1782.

Long 19th century (1795–1914) 
After the uprisings of 1831 and 1863, the tsar's repression against the Catholic Church intensified, and monasteries were closed en masse. These monasteries were previously very involved in religious and cultural activities throughout the former Lithuanian lands and were responsible for many schools, libraries, and charity institutions. During the years of Russian rule, a struggle began within the Catholic Church for the rights of faith and Lithuanian national identity, which were persistently defended by Bishop of Samogitia Motiejus Valančius. Valančius spread faith, sobriety, and literacy among Lithuanians.

20th century 
Lithuania regained its independence in 1918 and successfully defended it in the Lithuanian Wars of Independence. The Vatican recognized Lithuania's independence de jure in 1922. A concordat was signed in 1927 between Lithuania and the Holy See.

First Soviet occupation 
After the Soviet Union occupied Lithuania in the summer of 1940, the Church began to be persecuted. The Church and state were separated. The concordat and diplomatic relations with the Vatican were terminated. Church property was confiscated, religious education in schools was stopped, publishing of Catholic books and newspapers was banned. Dominican monasteries were also closed down. On 11-12 July 1940, many prominent Lithuanian public figures were arrested, including Catholic priests. During the Soviet mass deportation from Lithuania on 14-15 June 1941, 9 Lithuanian Catholic priests were deported. In the beginning of Operation Barbarossa in late June 1941, a total of 15 Lithuanian Catholic priests were murdered. On June 22, priests , Vaclovas Balsius and Jonas Petrikas in Būdavonė forest (Bartninkai district) were martyred by NKVD soldiers.

Second Soviet occupation 
During the second Soviet occupation, which began once the Red Army invaded Lithuanian lands in 1944, the persecution of the Church intensified. This was because of the regime's state atheism, as well as the Catholic Church's involvement in the Lithuanian anti-communist guerrilla war against Soviet occupation. Mass arrests and deportations of Lithuanian citizens, priests and believers, were carried out. Churches were closed down. The restrictions on the church's activities intensified, especially restricting the training of new clergy. In 1946, the bishop of Telšiai Vincentas Borisevičius was arrested and sentenced to death. Later, the bishops Teofilius Matulionis, Pranciškus Ramanauskas, Vilnius archbishop Mečislovas Reinys were arrested and imprisoned. The Soviet state seized the Vilnius Cathedral from the Catholic Church in 1950.

In the 1970s, the Catholic Church's underground activity intensified, as underground Catholic newspapers and magazines began to be published, and priests were trained underground. In 1972, the underground publication Chronicle of the Catholic Church of Lithuania began to be published. The number of initiatives to defend religious freedom increased.

Also during the Communist time, Apostolic Visitors were designated by the Holy See for the Lithuanian Roman Catholics in diaspora.

Hill of Crosses 

The nationally renowned anti-Communist resistance shrine, the Hill of Crosses, upon which thousands of Latin Rite crosses of all sizes have been placed, is located near the city of Šiauliai. Erecting Latin crosses on the hill was forbidden by the Czarist Russian Orthodox authorities in the 19th century. Later, in the 20th century, the Soviet authorities also forbade such explicit religious symbols. The crosses were removed in 1961 with tractors and bulldozers, but despite Soviet prohibitions, Catholics continued to put small crucifixes and larger crosses on the Hill of Crosses. Pope John Paul II visited the hill during his visit to Lithuania, primarily because it was a sign of anti-Communist Catholic resistance, as well as a Catholic religious site. Lithuania was the only majority-Catholic Soviet republic.

Independent Lithuania 
Lithuania regained its independence once more in 1990, during the dissolution of the Soviet Union. The Catholic Church is an influential factor in the country, and some priests actively led the resistance against the Communist regime and, after independence was regained, in support of traditionalism, especially in ethical questions.

The Catholic Church in Lithuania has after independence continued to campaign against liberal and socialist measures, especially in ethical questions.

The treaties of the Holy See and the Republic of Lithuania entered into force in 2000. Since then, the relations between the Catholic Church and the Lithuanian state have been regulated by three special treaties of the Republic of Lithuania and the Holy See, instead of the concordat.

Education 
Christian culture was spread in Lithuania through schools. Until the Third Partition of the Polish–Lithuanian Commonwealth in 1795, education was mainly taken care of by the Catholic Church. Initially, the first schools operated in Vilnius near the Franciscan monastery and cathedral. Vytautas settled the Benedictines in Senieji Trakai in 1409, where it was sought that they would open a school as well. A parish school for the townspeople was established, near the Church of St. Johns, Vilnius, in 1413. More schools appeared in the 15th and 16th centuries. In 1534, the Synod of Vilnius ordered priests to establish schools. The church leadership ordered in 1607 the establishment of primary schools in all parishes, while the higher schools were maintained by Jesuits, Piarists and other monks. In the 18th century, there were about 300 parochial schools in Lithuania, with 5,000 students.

The Jesuits establish a college in Vilnius in 1570. The Vilnius Academy was founded in 1579 by the Jesuits through the reorganization of the college they established nine years prior. The university trained Lithuanian clergymen and published Lithuanian-language religious literature. Jesuits also founded many colleges in other cities. The Jesuits head the Vilnius University until 1773. After the suppression of the Society of Jesus in 1773, the Commission of National Education took over the management of Vilnius University and higher schools.

Hierarchy 

 List of Apostolic Visitors for Lithuanian Catholics in Diaspora (historically, until 2003)

Catholic churches in Lithuania

The first churches appeared in Lithuania before the introduction of Christianity – they were built by merchants and craftsmen from other countries who lived here. After the baptism in 1387 the number of churches in Lithuania began to grow notably. In the middle of the twentieth century there were as many as 885 Catholic churches and chapels in Lithuania.

The first church in Lithuania, supposedly, was built by the Grand Duke Mindaugas in the thirteenth century. It was Vilnius Cathedral, which in its long history has been repeatedly destroyed and rebuilt. The oldest surviving stone church is St. Nicholas, built in the 14th – 15th centuries. It stands in Vilnius and visitors admire its Gothic and Romanesque features. St. Anne's Church is a masterpiece of late Gothic. The Chapel of the Gate of Dawn storing the icon of the Holy Virgin Mary, Mother of Mercy in Vilnius has many features of late Renaissance and is one of the holy places in Lithuania most visited by pilgrims. Impressive architectural work of baroque is St. Peter and Paul Church in Vilnius. The oldest wooden church of Lithuania is in Palušė, Ignalina district.

Catholic organizations in Lithuania
 Ateitis: Catholic children and youth organization, member of Fimcap

See also
 Apostolic Nunciature to Lithuania
 Christianization of Lithuania
 Saint Casimir
 List of Catholic pilgrimage sites in Lithuania

References

Sources

External links
 Katalikų Bažnyčia Lietuvoje / Catholic Church in Lithuania
 Official web site of Lithuanian Catholic Church
 Sanctuaries and Pilgrimage Sites in Lithuania
 

 
Catholic Church by country
Catholic Church in Europe